Caverna is an unincorporated community in southern McDonald County, Missouri, United States. It is located on U.S. Route 71, immediately north of the Missouri-Arkansas state line, opposite Bella Vista. Several businesses are located there.

A post office called Caverna was established in 1876, and remained in operation until 1906. The community was named for caves near the original town site.

References

Unincorporated communities in McDonald County, Missouri
Northwest Arkansas
Unincorporated communities in Missouri